Moments is the third album by singer Boz Scaggs, released in 1971. It was his debut album on the Columbia label.

Reception

In a contemporary review, Rolling Stone critic Charlie Burton hailed Moments as "one of the most transcendental albums to come out of rock in some time", "elaborately arranged and produced, but the result is a warm, funky spontaneity, somewhat reminiscent of Van Morrison, but, I think, more accessible." Allmusic gave a thoroughly warm retrospective review of the album, praising its mellow and laid-back tone. They also considered the album a precursor to Scaggs's greatest artistic achievement, saying that it "found him sketching out the blue-eyed soul that would eventually bring him fame when he streamlined it for 1976's Silk Degrees."

Track listing 
All tracks composed by Boz Scaggs except where indicated

Side One
"We Were Always Sweethearts" - 3:31
"Downright Women" - 4:38
 "Painted Bells" - 4:03
 "Alone, Alone" (David Brown) - 3:41
 "Near You" - 4:54

Side Two
 "I Will Forever Sing (The Blues)" (Powell St. John) - 5:16
 "Moments" - 4:35
 "Hollywood Blues" - 2:42
 "We Been Away" (David Brown) - 3:44
 "Can I Make It Last (Or Will It Just Be Over)" - 5:20 - Instrumental

Personnel
 Boz Scaggs - guitar, vocals
 James "Curley" Cooke - guitar
 John McFee - steel guitar
 Doug Simril - guitar, keyboards
 Joachim Young - keyboards
 Ben Sidran - keyboards, vibraphone
 David Brown - bass
 George Rains - drums
 Coke Escovedo, Pete Escovedo - percussion
 Bill Atwood - trumpet, flugelhorn
 Pat O'Hara - trombone, horn arrangements
 Mel Martin - saxophone
 Brian Rogers - string arrangements
 The Rita Coolidge Ladies Ensemble - backing vocals

Production
Produced, recorded and mixed by Glyn Johns
Recorded at Wally Heider Studios (San Francisco, CA)
Mixed at Island Studios (London, England)
Cover Design – Anne Blackford 
Photography – George H. Conger

References

External links 
 Moments Lyrics

1971 albums
Boz Scaggs albums
Albums produced by Glyn Johns
Albums recorded at Wally Heider Studios
Columbia Records albums